The following is a list of county roads in Hamilton County, Florida.  All county roads are maintained by the county in which they reside, however not all of them are marked with standard MUTCD approved county road shields.

County Roads in Hamilton County, Florida

References

FDOT Map of Hamilton County
FDOT GIS data, accessed January 2014

 
County